Death Fiend is an unreleased demo tape by the Swiss extreme metal band Hellhammer. It was recorded in June 1983, along with the Triumph of Death demo, and later appeared on the compilation album Demon Entrails.

Track listing
"Maniac" – 4:15
"Angel of Destruction" – 3:03
"Hammerhead" – 2:57
"Bloody Pussies" – 5:35
"Death Fiend" – 2:44
"Dark Warriors" – 3:15
"Chainsaw" – 4:12
"Ready for Slaughter" – 3:45
"Sweet Torment" – 2:17

Credits
Thomas Gabriel Fischer  Satanic Slaughter – vocals, guitars
Urs Sprenger a.k.a. Savage Damage – bass
Jörg Neubart a.k.a. Bloodhunter – drums

Notes

References
Fischer, T. G. (2000). Are You Morbid? Into the Pandemonium of Celtic Frost. London: Sanctuary Publishing Limited.

1983 albums
Hellhammer albums